Deserticossus campicola is a species of moth of the family Cossidae. It is found in Russia, Kazakhstan, Kyrgyzstan, Azerbaijan, Uzbekistan and western China.

The length of the forewings is 19–20 mm for males and 22–28 mm for females. The forewings are grey, sprinkled with black. The hindwings are uniform grey.

The larvae develop in Haloxylon wood, where they hibernate twice.

References

Moths described in 1854
Cossinae
Moths of Asia